Derbyshire County Cricket Club in 1901 represents the cricket season when the English club Derbyshire had been playing for thirty years. It was their seventh season in the County Championship and they failed to win a single match, ending bottom of the Championship table.

1901 season

Derbyshire CCC played twenty games in the County Championship in 1901 in addition to  matches against W.G. Grace's London County Cricket Club, MCC and the touring South Africans. Derbyshire failed to win any first class  match during the season.

The captain for the year was Samuel Hill Wood in his third season as captain. However he only took part in five matches and Albert Lawton filled the role on the pitch. Levi Wright was top scorer making two centuries, one of 193. Billy Bestwick  took 71 wickets.

Gilbert Curgenven made his debut for the side as did  Robert Else who only played in two seasons. Joseph Burton, Arthur Barton, James Oldknow and Arthur Morton made their only appearances for the side during the 1901 season.

Nudger Needham captained the English football team in 1901.

Matches

{| class="wikitable" width="100%"
! bgcolor="#efefef" colspan=6 | List of  matches
|- bgcolor="#efefef"
!No.
!Date
!V
!Result 
!Margin
!Notes

|
|- 
|1
|13 May 1901 
|London County Cricket Club   Crystal Palace Park 
|bgcolor="#FF0000"|Lost
|Innings and 119 runs
 | Not a County Championship matchBeldam 125; Fishwick 103; Sinclair 8-32; JJ Hulme 5-61
|- 
|2
|16 May 1901 
|SurreyKennington Oval 
|bgcolor="#FF0000"|Lost
|Innings and 111 runs 
| Hayward 158; Jephson 133; W Bestwick 7-97; Lockwood 7-57; Richardson 6-67
|- 
|3
|20 May 1901 
|Yorkshire   Fartown, Huddersfield 
|bgcolor="#FF0000"|Lost
|Innings and 282 runs 
| Tunnicliffe 145; Brown 5-33; Hirst 7-43
|- 
|4
|23 May 1901 
|MCC Lord's Cricket Ground, St John's Wood 
|bgcolor="#FF0000"|Lost
|9 wickets 
| Not a County Championship matchHearne 7-67; Rawlin 5-28
|- 
|5
|27 May 1901 
|HampshireCounty Ground, Southampton 
|bgcolor="#FF0000"|Lost
|2 wickets 
| S Evershed 123; Greig 6-38; Llewellyn 5-76; W Bestwick 6-71
|- 
|6
|30 May 1901 
|Surrey  County Ground, Derby 
|bgcolor="#FF0000"|Lost
|5 wickets
| Lees 5-47; JJ Hulme 5-71 
|- 
|7
| 06 Jun 1901 
|South Africans County Ground, Derby 
|bgcolor="#FF0000"|Lost
|5 wickets 
| Not a County Championship matchBisset 184; Graham 6-84 and 5-47 
|- 
|8
|10 Jun 1901 
| Essex  County Ground, Leyton 
|bgcolor="#FFCC00"|Drawn
|
| Owen 106; Perrin 101; Reeves 6-46 
|- 
|9
| 13 Jun 1901 
| Worcestershire   County Ground, New Road, Worcester 
|bgcolor="#FF0000"|Lost
|Innings and 49 runs
| Wilson 6-55
|- 
|10
| 17 Jun 1901 
|Gloucestershire Ashley Down Ground, Bristol 
|bgcolor="#FFCC00"|Drawn
|
| L Wright 155; W Chatterton 169; Langdon 114; Huggins 6-100 
|- 
|11
| 20 Jun 1901 
| Warwickshire  County Ground, Derby 
|bgcolor="#FFCC00"|Drawn
| 
| Willie Quaife 117;
|- 
|12
|27 Jun 1901 
|Yorkshire   North Road Ground, Glossop 
|bgcolor="#FF0000"|Lost
|245 runs
| Wainwright 108; W Bestwick 7-70; Haigh 5-55 
|- 
|13
|01 Jul 1901 
|London County Cricket Club   Queen's Park, Chesterfield 
|bgcolor="#FFCC00"|Drawn
|
| Not a County Championship matchW Storer 5-20
|- 
|14
| 15 Jul 1901 
| Nottinghamshire   County Ground, Derby 
|bgcolor="#FFCC00"|Drawn
|
|  Gunn 273; L Wright 193; Jones 6-93
|- 
|15
| 18 Jul 1901 
| Leicestershire   North Road Ground, Glossop 
|bgcolor="#FF0000"|Lost
|Innings and 20 runs
| King 143; MacDonald 147*; Geeson 104*; Geeson 6-128  and 6-111
|- 
|16
| 22 Jul 1901 
|Gloucestershire County Ground, Derby 
|bgcolor="#FFCC00"|Drawn
|
| Paish 6-120 
|- 
|17
| 29 Jul 1901 
|Lancashire   County Ground, Derby 
|bgcolor="#FF0000"|Lost
|Innings and 184 runs 
| Ward 117; Tyldesley 158; JJ Hulme 6-135; Cuttell 7-19; Webb 5-58
|- 
|18
| 05 Aug 1901 
|HampshireAt County Ground, Derby 
|bgcolor="#FF0000"|Lost
|5 wickets
| Sprot 130; Llewellyn 5-108; JJ Hulme 5-73; W Bestwick 5-89
|- 
|19
| 08 Aug 1901 
|Lancashire   Old Trafford, Manchester 
|bgcolor="#FFCC00"|Drawn
|
|
|- 
|20
|12 Aug 1901 
| Nottinghamshire   Welbeck Abbey Cricket Ground 
|bgcolor="#FF0000"|Lost
|Innings and 159 runs
| Iremonger 108; Wass 8-17 and 5-23; Gunn 5-14
|- 
|21
|15 Aug 1901 
| Warwickshire   Edgbaston, Birmingham 
|bgcolor="#FF0000"|Lost
|Innings and 52 runs 
| Fishwick 140*; Charlesworth 6-45 
|- 
|22
|19 Aug 1901 
| Worcestershire   County Ground, Derby 
|bgcolor="#FF0000"|Lost
|Innings and 121 runs
| H Foster 152; Bowley 140; R Foster 111; Wilson 6-57; Pearson 5-48
|- 
|23
| 22 Aug 1901 
| Essex   Queen's Park, Chesterfield
|bgcolor="#FF0000"|Lost
|9 wickets
| Carpenter 144; Russell 100; Mead 6-97; Young 7-48
|- 
|24
| 29 Aug 1901 
| Leicestershire  Aylestone Road, Leicester  
|bgcolor="#FFCC00"|Drawn
|
| King 5-65

Statistics

County Championship batting averages

Paul Boissier and Oswald Burton played in the match against MCC, but not in the County Championship.

County Championship  bowling averages

County Championship Wicket keeping
W Storer 		Matches 18	Catches 21, Stumping 3
W Wilmot		Matches 3	Catches 8

See also
Derbyshire County Cricket Club seasons
1901 English cricket season

References

1901 in English cricket
Derbyshire County Cricket Club seasons
English cricket seasons in the 20th century